Seddera pedunculata is a species of plant in the family Convolvulaceae. It is endemic to Yemen.

References

Endemic flora of Socotra
pedunculata
Data deficient plants
Taxonomy articles created by Polbot
Taxa named by Isaac Bayley Balfour
Taxa named by Johannes Gottfried Hallier